Carmen de Burgos y Seguí (pseudonyms, Colombine, Gabriel Luna, Perico el de los Palotes, Raquel, Honorine and Marianela; Almería, December 10, 1867 – Madrid, October 9, 1932) was a Spanish journalist, writer, translator and women's rights activist. Johnson describes her as a "modern" if not "modernist" writer.

Early years
She was born in 1867 in Almeria to a middle-class family, in which her father owned a gold mine. Her father José de Burgos Cañizares and her uncle Ferdinand were in charge of the vice-consulate of Portugal in Almeria. Her mother, Nicosia Segui Nieto, had come to the marriage with a substantial inheritance.

Career
She escaped her family when she met Arturo Asterz Bustos. He was fifteen years older than her; he was a poet, writer, and an alcoholic. Her new husband earned money as a typesetter on the family's newspaper, but she quickly discovered that this was to be her work. She and Arturo were unhappily married for 17 years, having four children - of whom only one survived. In 1898 her infant son died and she enrolled at the local college to obtain a teaching certificate. She quickly advanced, and within a year she was qualified to teach primary. By the end of 1898, she was qualified to teach secondary school and by 1900 she was qualified to teach teachers. Armed with her new achievements, she could anticipate employment for life. She and her remaining daughter left her abusive and unfaithful husband and they set up their own house in Guadalajara where her first book was written. During this time she had learnt how to write for a living, she had earned her independence and she had developed a contempt for the institution of marriage. Burgos regarded herself as a feminist but her gender meant that her writings were not included when evaluations were made of Spanish (male) modernism.

However Burgos was nominally creating a number of novels for the "weekly novel" market that was popular at the start of the twentieth century. Burgos's novels however dealt with legal and political themes. Her novels dealt with taboo subjects including male and female homosexuality and transvestism. She highlighted the dual values applied that blamed women who were adulterers whereas men's involvement was forgiven. Women were given responsibility for illegitimate children and the law overlooked the abuse that some women found within their marriages. It has been noted that Burgos raised controversial subjects concerning gender, the law and rights but her writing did not offer a solution. She exposed to the readers the disparity between traditional values of female education and modern life. Burgos however exposed difficult issues as a dramatic event and in 1904 she had led a campaign to improve the availability of divorce.

Recognition
In 1906, Burgos became the first female professional journalist in Spain as editor of Madrid's Diario Universal. She also served as the first president of the International League of Iberian and Latin American Women (Liga Internacional de Mujeres Ibéricas e Hispanoamericanas). During Franco's dictatorship, Burgos was written out of the history books. Following the restoration of democracy she was again recognised and reinstated into the history of women's rights in Spain.

Selected works 

Essays and other works

 Ensayos literarios, 1900.
 Álbum artístico literario del siglo XX, 1901.
 Notas del alma, 1901, (colección de coplas populares)
 El divorcio en España, 1904.
 La mujer en España, 1906.
 Por Europa, 1906
 La voz de los muertos, 1911
 Leopardi, 1911
 Misión social de la mujer, 1911
 Cartas sin destinatario, 1912
 Al balcón, 1913
 Impresiones de Argentina, 1914
 Confidencias de artistas, 1916
 Peregrinaciones, 1917
 Mis viajes por Europa, 1917
 ¿Quiere usted comer bien?, 1917
 Fígaro, 1919
 La Emperatriz Eugenia, 1920
 Hablando con los descendientes, 1929
 Gloriosa vida y desdichada muerte de D. Rafael del Riego, 1931.
 Amadís de Gaula, s.a.

Novels

 Los inadaptados, 1909
 La rampa, 1917
 El último contrabandista, 1918
 Los anticuarios, 1919
 El retorno, 1922
 La malcasada, 1923.
 Los espirituados, 1923.
 La mujer fantástica, 1924.
 El tío de todos, 1925.
 Quiero vivir mi vida, 1931.
 Los anticuarios.

Short stories

 Ensayos literarios, 1900. 
 Alucinación, 1905 
 El anhelo 
 El abogado 
 El artículo 438
 Cuentos: El tesoro del castillo
 Cuentos de Colombine
 En la guerra
 Honor de familia

Translations

 Historia de mi vida (muda, sorda y ciega), 1904
 La guerra ruso-japonesa, 1904.
 La inferioridad mental de la mujer, 1904.
 Loca por razón de Estado, 1904.
 Los Evangelios y la segunda generación cristiana, 1904
 La Iglesia cristiana, 1905
 Diez y seis años en Siberia, 1906.
 En el mundo de las mujeres, 1906.
 El rey sin corona, 1908.
 La conquista de un Imperio, 1911.
 Los misterios de la india, 1911.
 La corona de olivo silvestre, 1911-1913.
 Fisiología del placer, 1913.
 Las mañanas en Florencia, 1913
 Las piedras de Venecia, 1913.
 Las siete lámparas de la arquitectura, 1913.
 Los pintores modernos. El paisaje, 1913.
 Cuentos a Maxa, 1914.
 El reposo de San Marcos. Historia de Venecia, 1915.
 La Biblia de Amiens, 1916.
 La decisión, 1917.
 Una idea de parisiense por página, 1917.
 La perseverancia, 1919.
 Defnis y Cloe, 1910.
 Los últimos filibusteros, 1913.
 La princesa muda, s.a.
 El tío Geromo (Crainqueville).
 Cuentistas italianos.

Translations into English
 Take Six: Six Spanish Women Writers, edited and translated by Kathryn Phillips-Miles and Simon Deefholts, Dedalus Books, 2022: Contains a selection of her stories in English translation.

References

Bibliography 
 
Memorias de Colombine, la primera periodista por Utrera, Federico. – Majadahonda: Hijos de Muley-Rubio, 1998. 
Carmen de Burgos Colombine por Bravo Cela, Blanca. 
 Carmen de Burgos, Colombine (1867–1932). Biografía y obra literaria. Tesis doctoral a cargo de Concepción Núñez Rey. Universidad Complutense de Madrid, 1992.

External links
 

1867 births
1932 deaths
People from Almería
Spanish women writers
Spanish journalists
Spanish translators
Spanish women's rights activists
Spanish feminist writers
Spanish suffragists
Women cookbook writers